Ultimate Race Pro (stylized as Ultim@te Race Pro) is a racing video game, created by Kalisto Entertainment and published by MicroProse, developed in 1997 and released in 1998. It was bundled with PowerVR boards.

Gameplay
The game allows a selection of 16 cars, 6 tracks, and weather choices. People can play alone, against the computer, or multiplayer. When playing against the PC (8 opponents), players can choose between easy, normal, and hard difficulty.

Development
The game was showcased at E3 1997.

Critical reception

The game received favorable reviews according to the review aggregation website GameRankings. Next Generation called it "a great experience for all PC race drivers."

The game sold over 1 million units worldwide.

References

External links
Official website
Ultim@te Race Pro on 3dgamers.com

1998 video games
MicroProse games
Racing video games
Video games developed in France
Windows games
Windows-only games